The Men's time trial of the 2020 UCI Road World Championships was a cycling event that took place on 25 September 2020 in Imola, Italy. Rohan Dennis was the defending champion. Italy's Filippo Ganna won the event, with Wout van Aert in second place, and Stefan Küng finishing in third.

The event took place on a  flat course, starting from the Autodromo Internazionale Enzo e Dino Ferrari (a motor racing circuit) before turning at Borgo Tossignano to return to the finish line at the Autodromo.

Qualification

Participating nations
57 cyclists from 38 nations competed in the event. The number of cyclists per nation is shown in parentheses.

Final classification
56 out of the race's 57 cyclists finished the -long course.

References

Men's time trial
UCI Road World Championships – Men's time trial
2020 in men's road cycling